Tuanku Sir Abdul Rahman ibni Almarhum Tuanku Muhammad  (24 August 1895 – 1 April 1960) was the first Paramount Ruler or Yang di-Pertuan Agong of the Federation of Malaya, eighth Yang di-Pertuan Besar of Seri Menanti and second Yang di-Pertuan Besar of modern Negeri Sembilan.

Early career

Born at Seri Menanti on August 24, 1895, he was the second son of Tuanku Muhammad ibni Tuanku Antah, first Yang di-Pertuan Besar of modern Negeri Sembilan and seventh Yang di-Pertuan Besar of Seri Menanti (1888–1933) by his second wife, Tunku Puan Chik.

He received his primary education at the Jempol Malay School, going on to the Malay College between 1907 and 1914.  He worked at the Federal Secretariat in Kuala Lumpur for a period of one year before being appointed Assistant Collector of Land Revenue in Seremban.  He served in the Malayan Volunteer Infantry as a Second Lieutenant, to be promoted Lieutenant in 1918.

On the death of his elder brother, Tunku Abdul Aziz, in 1917, he was groomed as heir to the throne and received the title of Tunku Muda Serting.

He was later appointed as Assistant Malay Officer in Klang before being transferred to Sepang. He was then assigned to work in Ulu Selangor as Assistant Collector of Land Revenue. As a result of his perseverance and diligence, he was promoted to Assistant District Officer. The turning point of his career was in 1925, when he served for a short period in the Kuala Lumpur Supreme Court.

In 1925, he accompanied his father, who was then the ruler of Negeri Sembilan, on a trip to the United Kingdom for the British Empire Exhibition in Wembley and to visit His Majesty King George V. During the journey to the United Kingdom, he decided that he wanted to study law. With the approval of his father Tuanku Muhammad, he stayed in the United Kingdom until he completed his studies and received a degree in law.

He stayed on to qualify as a barrister from Inner Temple.  Three years later, in 1928, he was admitted to the bar. In London, he was elected first President of the Kesatuan Melayu United Kingdom, one of the earliest Malay nationalist groups.

Upon returning to Malaya in December 1928, he served in the Malayan Civil Service in various parts of the country. For the first few years, he worked hard until he became a Magistrate. Subsequently, he was appointed District Officer.

Election as Yang di-Pertuan Besar of Negeri Sembilan

In 1933, following the death of his father, he succeeded him onto the throne of Negeri Sembilan. At that time, he was already an advocate, hence making him the only Malay ruler with an advocate and solicitor's qualifications.

Tuanku Abdul Rahman (as he became) admitted to British interrogators that he had made speeches in favour of the Japanese during the latter's military occupation of Malaya (1942–1945) but this had been done under duress and that the Japanese forcibly removed certain of his royal privileges.

Although he subsequently signed the Malayan Union treaty, he repudiated it later and upon the suggestion of Sultan Badlishah of Kedah, engaged a London-based lawyer to represent the case of the Malay rulers against the Malayan Union plan of Clement Attlee's government.

Election as Yang di-Pertuan Agong
Tuanku Abdul Rahman was elected first Yang di-Pertuan Agong or Paramount Ruler of independent Malaya on 31 August 1957 for a five-year term by eight votes to one, defeating the more senior Sultan Abu Bakar of Pahang.

He had been the ruler of Negeri Sembilan for 24 years before being elected as the first Yang di-Pertuan Agong.

Installation
Tuanku Abdul Rahman was installed as the first Yang di-Pertuan Agong of independent Malaya on 2 September 1957 at the throne room of the Istana Negara.

As Malay rulers do not traditionally possess crowns, he was installed by kissing the royal kris of state (keris kerajaan) to the beat of the nobat, a tradition which has been followed by every Yang di-Pertuan Agong since.

In honour of Tuanku Abdul Rahman, all subsequent Yang di-Pertuan Agong of Malaysia have also used the headdress with Dendam Tak Sudah (literally Unending Revenge) style, the fashion employed in Negeri Sembilan.

Death and funeral
Tuanku Abdul Rahman died in his sleep at Istana Negara in Kuala Lumpur in the early morning of  1 April 1960.  The lying in state was held at the Banquet Hall of the Istana Negara.  On 2 April 1960, a state funeral procession was held in Kuala Lumpur, whereupon Abdul Rahman's teak coffin was then taken by train to Seremban and later by hearse to the Istana Besar, Seri Menanti.  He was buried at the Royal Mausoleum in Seri Menanti, Negeri Sembilan on 5 April 1960.

Legacy
Tuanku Abdul Rahman's portrait is still featured on the obverse of Malaysian Ringgit banknotes since the First series which was first issued in 1967.

Sekolah Tuanku Abdul Rahman (abbr. STAR) is a premier, all-boys fully residential school in Malaysia funded by the Government of Malaysia and is named after the first Yang di-Pertuan Agong of the Federation of Malaya, Tuanku Abdul Rahman ibni Tuanku Muhammad. It is located in Ipoh, Perak and was built in 1957.

Belief in democracy
Tuanku Abdul Rahman believed strongly in parliamentary democracy and one of his most memorable quotes was to a foreign dignitary from the Middle East who in 1959 complained about Prime Minister Tunku Abdul Rahman Putra Al-Haj's "high handed" manner and wanted the King to sack him. To this, the King replied: "Alas I can't sack him; he is elected by the people, and as Prime Minister of the country he can sack me!"

Family life

Tuanku Abdul Rahman married four times. His marriages were to:
 in 1919 to Dulcie Campbell, a Eurasian nurse who embraced Islam and took the name Cik Maimunah (divorced)
 in 1920 to Tunku Maharun binti Tunku Mambang, a member of the Negeri Sembilan royal family (divorced)
 in 1929 to Tunku Kurshiah binti Tunku Besar Burhanuddin, a cousin, who became first Raja Permaisuri Agong or Queen of Malaya 
 in 1948 to Tunku Zaidah binti Tunku Zakaria, another cousin.

Tuanku Abdul Rahman fathered three sons and five daughters. His second wife, Tuanku Maharum gave birth to his firstborn son, Tuanku Munawir. Cik Engku Maimunah, his first wife, gave birth to two sons and two daughters. The eldest is Tunku Aida, followed by Tuanku Ja'afar, Tunku Sheilah and Tunku Abdullah. Tunku Kursiah, his third wife, gave birth to two daughters. His fourth wife, Tunku Zaidah, gave birth to his youngest child, a daughter.

Two of his sons succeeded him as Yang di-Pertuan Besar of Negeri Sembilan:
 Tuanku Munawir (son of Tunku Maharun), who reigned from 1960 to 1967 as the ninth Yang di-Pertuan Besar.
 Tuanku Ja'afar (son of Dulcie Campbell), who succeeded his brother in 1967, as the tenth Yang di-Pertuan Besar, and reigned till 27 December 2008. He served as the tenth Yang di-Pertuan Agong from 1994 to 1999.

His grandson, Tuanku Muhriz, currently reigns as the eleventh Yang di-Pertuan Besar of Negeri Sembilan.

His daughter, Sultanah Bahiyah, from his third marriage to Tunku Kurshiah served as Sultanah of Kedah upon the accession of her husband, Sultan Abdul Halim, in 1958 until her death in 2003. She also served as the fifth Raja Permaisuri Agong of Malaysia from 1970–1975.

Issue

Hobbies and interests
Tuanku Abdul Rahman had a keen interest in sports such as cricket, football and tennis. However, his favourite sport was boxing. In fact, when he was young, he loved wearing boxing gloves to box with his sons.

Awards and recognitions

National Honours
:
 Recipient of the  Order of the Crown of the Realm (DMN) (1958)
 Grand Commander of the Order of the Defender of the Realm (SMN)

Foreign Honours
:
 Knight Commander of the Order of St Michael and St George (KCMG) - Sir (1934)
 Recipient of the King George V Silver Jubilee Medal (1935)
 Recipient of the King George VI Coronation Medal (1937)
 Recipient of the Queen Elizabeth II Coronation Medal (1953)
 Knight Grand Cross of the Order of St Michael and St George (GCMG) - Sir (1957)

 Member First Class of the Family Order of Laila Utama (DK) - Dato Laila Utama (1959)

Places named after him
Several places were named after him, including:
 Jalan Tuanku Abdul Rahman, a road in Kuala Lumpur
 Medan Tuanku district in downtown Kuala Lumpur
 Medan Tuanku Monorail station
 Sekolah Tuanku Abdul Rahman, a boys school in Ipoh, Perak
 Tuanku Abdul Rahman Mosque in Sarikei, Sarawak
 Tuanku Abdul Rahman Stadium in Paroi, Negeri Sembilan
 SK Tuanku Abdul Rahman, a primary school in Gemas, Negeri Sembilan
 SMK Tuanku Abdul Rahman, a secondary school in Gemas, Negeri Sembilan
 SMK Tuanku Abdul Rahman, a secondary school in Nibong Tebal, Penang
 SMK Tuanku Abdul Rahman, a secondary school in Rawang, Selangor
 Tuanku Abdul Rahman Residential College, a residential college at University of Malaya, Kuala Lumpur

Notes

External links
 Malaysia National Library's Tuanku Abdul Rahman biography.
 Council of Rulers' Tuanku Abdul Rahman biography (in Malay).
 Yang di-Pertuan Agong (Malaysian Monarchy)

Monarchs of Malaysia
Abdul Rahman
1895 births
1960 deaths
Minangkabau people
Abdul Rahman
Abdul Rahman
Malaysian people of Minangkabau descent
Malaysian Muslims
Members of the Inner Temple
Knights Grand Cross of the Order of St Michael and St George
20th-century Malaysian politicians
Recipients of the Order of the Crown of the Realm